Pentagonia is a genus of over 40 species of plants in the Coffee or Gardenia family (Rubiaceae}. Pentagonia species are native to Central America and northern South America, and grow in moist tropical forests below 900m. The genus was first described by George Bentham in 1845.  The genus is noteworthy for its opposite pairs of huge leaves in a variety of shapes including entire, shallowly or deeply lobed, and even pinnate. These leaves can, in the case of a recently discovered species, be up to four feet (1.2 meters) long not including the six inch (15 cm) petiole, and up to 2.5 feet (76 centimeters) in width.

Species
, Plants of the World Online accepted the following species:

Pentagonia amazonica (Ducke) L.Andersson & Rova
Pentagonia angustifolia C.M.Taylor
Pentagonia australis C.M.Taylor & Janovec
Pentagonia baumannii Cornejo & Rova
Pentagonia bocataurensis Dwyer
Pentagonia bonifaziana Cornejo
Pentagonia breviloba L.Andersson & Rova
Pentagonia carniflora Cornejo & Rova
Pentagonia chocoensis Cornejo
Pentagonia clementinensis Cornejo
Pentagonia costaricensis (Standl.) W.C.Burger & C.M.Taylor
Pentagonia donnell-smithii (Standl.) Standl.
Pentagonia dwyeriana C.M.Taylor
Pentagonia gambagam Hammel & Aguilar
Pentagonia gigantifolia Ducke
Pentagonia gomez-lauritoi Hammel
Pentagonia grandiflora Standl.
Pentagonia gymnopoda (Standl.) Standl.
Pentagonia hirsuta Standl.
Pentagonia imparipinnata Cornejo
Pentagonia involucrata C.M.Taylor
Pentagonia lanciloba Cornejo
Pentagonia lobata C.M.Taylor
Pentagonia macrophylla Benth., syn. Pentagonia orthoneura
Pentagonia magnifica K.Krause
Pentagonia microcarpa L.Andersson & Rova
Pentagonia nuciformis Dwyer
Pentagonia osaensis C.M.Taylor
Pentagonia osapinnata Aguilar, N.Zamora & Hammel
Pentagonia pachiteana Cornejo
Pentagonia parvifolia Steyerm.
Pentagonia pinnatifida Seem.
Pentagonia rubriflora D.R.Simpson
Pentagonia sanblasensis C.M.Taylor
Pentagonia spathicalyx K.Schum., syn. Pentagonia peruviana
Pentagonia subauriculata Standl.
Pentagonia subsessilis L.Andersson & Rova
Pentagonia tapacula Cornejo
Pentagonia tinajita Seem.
Pentagonia villosula L.Andersson & Rova
Pentagonia wendlandii Hook.f.
Pentagonia williamsii Standl.
Pentagonia wurdackii Steyerm.

References

 
Rubiaceae genera